Michael Chacón Ibargüen (born 11 April 1994) is a professional footballer who plays as a midfielder for Dutch club Helmond Sport on loan from Excelsior. Born in Colombia, he represented youth teams of the Netherlands.

Club career
Chacón came through the Heerenveen youth academy and joined Dordrecht in 2015. He made his professional debut in the Eerste Divisie for Dordrecht on 7 August 2015 in a game against FC Eindhoven.

On 17 August 2021, he returned to the Netherlands and signed a two-year contract with Excelsior.

On 31 August 2022, Chacón joined Helmond Sport. He signed a loan contract for the 2022–23 season, and an additional two-year contract that will come into effect at the end of the season upon the expiration of his contract with Excelsior.

References

External links
 

1994 births
Living people
People from Palmira, Valle del Cauca
Dutch footballers
Colombian footballers
Dutch people of Colombian descent
Colombian emigrants to the Netherlands
Association football midfielders
Netherlands youth international footballers
FC Dordrecht players
FC Emmen players
Excelsior Rotterdam players
Helmond Sport players
Atlético Nacional footballers
Eredivisie players
Eerste Divisie players
Categoría Primera A players
Sportspeople from Valle del Cauca Department